Brothers in Blood is a Bulgarian Dutch hardcore punk band.

Inspired by groups such as 25 ta Life, to which the band owes its name, Brothers in Blood was formed in 1998 by former members of recently disbanded hardcore outfit Pool Punishers. After their hastily recorded demo sessions became a favorite of the local hardcore audience, the band gained more popularity and eventually got in touch with the New York City-based label Method Of Groove owned by Joey Z (Life Of Agony, Carnivore). In early 2012 Joey Z joined the band in the studio to produce their EP "As Time Goes By...".

Over the years Brothers In Blood have toured occasionally around Europe. They have shared stages with bands such as Ignite, Biohazard, Merauder, and D.R.I., Slpashot and many more. The band is well known in Holland where their guitar player Sven resides for years.

The song "Don't Say My Name" from their first CD "Take Your Life Back" features Zoli of Ignite on guest vocals.

Most of the band members have and still are participating in other music projects such as Get Some!, Vendetta, Piranha, Alien Industry, S.I.M.B. & more

In 2015 the band was seen working on a new material which eventually resulted in their split CD  Victory Speech with the Brazilian hardcore classics Questions

Discography
Pleven Hardcore Demo (1998)
Take Your Life Back (2008)
As Time Goes By... (2012)
There Will Be Blood (2015)

References

External links
 Brothers in Blood at Bulgarian Rock Archives

Musical groups established in 1998
Bulgarian punk rock groups